Dutson is a hamlet northeast of Launceston in Cornwall, England, and on the A388 main road. It is in the civil parish of St Stephens by Launceston Rural

References

Hamlets in Cornwall
Launceston, Cornwall